Johan Jans (also Juhan Jans; 7 February 1880 Aakre Parish (now Elva Parish), Kreis Dorpat – 21 December 1941 Solikamsk, Russia) was an Estonian politician. He was a member of Estonian Constituent Assembly.

References

1880 births
1941 deaths
People from Elva Parish
People from Kreis Dorpat
Estonian Social Democratic Workers' Party politicians
Estonian Socialist Workers' Party politicians
Members of the Estonian Constituent Assembly
Members of the Riigikogu, 1920–1923
Members of the Riigikogu, 1923–1926
Members of the Riigikogu, 1929–1932
20th-century Estonian lawyers
University of Tartu alumni
Estonian people who died in Soviet detention
People who died in the Gulag